Perilous Waters is a 1948 American drama film directed by Jack Bernhard and written by Richard Wormser and Francis Rosenwald. The film stars Don Castle, Audrey Long, Peggy Knudsen, Samuel S. Hinds, Gloria Holden and John Miljan. The film was released on February 14, 1948 by Monogram Pictures.

Plot

Cast          
Don Castle as Willie Hunter
Audrey Long as Judy Gage
Peggy Knudsen as Pat Ferris
Samuel S. Hinds as Dana Ferris
Gloria Holden as Mrs. Ferris
John Miljan as Carter Larkin
Walter Sande as Franklin
Stanley Andrews as Capt. Porter
Cy Kendall as The Boss
Gene Garrick as Fred
George Ramsey as Bart
Mike Killian as Brooks
Julian Rivero as Fisherman

References

External links
 

1948 films
American drama films
1948 drama films
Monogram Pictures films
Films directed by Jack Bernhard
American black-and-white films
1940s English-language films
1940s American films